Minuscule 463 (in the Gregory-Aland numbering), is a Greek minuscule manuscript of the New Testament, on parchment. Palaeographically it has been assigned to the 12th century. 
Formerly it was labeled by 103a and 118p.

Description 

The codex contains scholia to the Acts and Epistles, with the entire text for Acts of the Apostles 1:1-9:12 on 235 parchment leaves, with some lacunae. The text is written in two columns per page, 39 lines per page.

The order of books: Acts, Catholic epistles, and Pauline epistles.

Kurt Aland the Greek text of the codex did not place in any Category.

In 1 John 5:6 it has textual variant δι' ὕδατος καὶ πνεύματος (through water and spirit) together with the manuscripts 43, 241, 945, 1241, 1831, 1877*, 1891.

History 

The manuscript came from the Iviron monastery at Mount Athos.

The manuscript was examined by Matthaei and Treu. It is currently housed at the State Historical Museum (V. 95, S. 346) in Moscow.

Formerly it was labeled by 103a and 118p. In 1908 Gregory gave the number 463 to it.

See also 

 List of New Testament minuscules
 Biblical manuscript
 Textual criticism

Notes

References

Further reading 

 C. F. Matthaei, Novum Testamentum Graece et Latine (Riga, 1782-1788), p. 269f, XVI, XXVII.
 Die griechischen Handschriften des Neuen Testaments in der UdSSR; eine systematische Auswertung des Texthandschriften in Leningrad, Moskau, Kiev, Odessa, Tbiblisi und Erevan, Texte und Untersuchungen 91 (Berlin, 1966), pp. 285–288.

External links 
 

Greek New Testament minuscules
12th-century biblical manuscripts